Réka Bíziková (born 21 December 1991) is a Slovak-born Hungarian handball player for HC DAC and the Slovak national team.
Bízik, who was born in Slovakia into an ethnic Hungarian family obtained the Hungarian citizenship in January 2018.

Her sister, Boglárka is also a professional handball player. They both play for HC DAC.

She previously played for Érd HC and Mosonmagyaróvári KC SE.

References

1991 births
Living people
Slovak female handball players